Jakub Świerczok (born 28 December 1992) is a Polish professional footballer who plays as a striker for Ekstraklasa club Zagłębie Lubin.

Club career
Born in Tychy, Świerczok began his career at Polonia Bytom. After scoring 12 goals in 18 matches in the I liga, he joined Bundesliga club 1. FC Kaiserslautern on a three-and-a-half-year contract in January 2012.

On 16 June 2017, Świerczok signed a contract with Zagłębie Lubin. He was a member of Zagłębie's squad for half season, scoring 17 goals in 25 games in all competition.

Ludogorets Razgrad
On 19 January 2018, Świerczok completed a move to Bulgarian club Ludogorets Razgrad for €1 million on a long-term contract. He made his debut for the team on 15 February 2018 in a Europa League Round of 32 match against Italian grand Milan. At the end of the week he completed his First League debut against Botev Plovdiv. His debut goal came on 23 March 2018 in a league match against Etar. On 6 April 2018, coming as a substitute, he helped his team to take the title derby against CSKA Sofia by scoring 2 goals for the 3–2 win.

Nagoya Grampus
On 20 July 2021, Nagoya Grampus announced the signing of Świerczok from Piast Gliwice.
In December 2021, Świerczok was suspended from football activities after testing positive for a banned substance in a doping test conducted after a match against Pohang Steelers, for the AFC Champions League. On 28 October 2022, Nagoya Grampus released a public statement, communicating the punishment issued by the AFC would be a 4-year ban for the player on all football-related activities, counting from 9 December 2021, where a provisional ban was issued against him.

Return to Zagłębie
In early February 2023, following an appeal, the Court of Arbitration for Sport overturned Świerczok's ban and cleared him of any wrongdoing. Shortly after, on 10 February 2023, he returned to Zagłębie Lubin on a deal until the end of the season, with a one-year extension option.

International career
Świerczok's first experience of international football came in 2011 with Poland U20. In 2012, he made three appearances for the Poland U21.

On 3 November 2017, Świerczok was called up to the Poland senior team for the first time, for their friendlies with Uruguay and Mexico. He made his debut on 10 November against Uruguay, replacing Kamil Wilczek for the final 23 minutes.

Personal life
In March 2020, Świerczok and his girlfriend helped out a 73-year-old woman who had fainted near her home in Razgrad, by moving her away from the road and calling the medical emergency services.

Career statistics

Club

International

Scores and results list Poland's goal tally first, score column indicates score after each Świerczok goal.

Honours
Ludogorets
 Bulgarian League: 2017–18, 2018–19, 2019–20
 Bulgarian Supercup: 2018, 2019

Nagoya Grampus
 J.League Cup: 2021

Individual
Ekstraklasa Player of the Month: November 2020, December 2020, April 2021, May 2021

References

External links
 
 
 

Living people
1992 births
People from Tychy
Sportspeople from Silesian Voivodeship
Polish footballers
Poland youth international footballers
Poland under-21 international footballers
Poland international footballers
Association football forwards
Polonia Bytom players
1. FC Kaiserslautern players
Piast Gliwice players
Zawisza Bydgoszcz players
Górnik Łęczna players
GKS Tychy players
Zagłębie Lubin players
PFC Ludogorets Razgrad players
Nagoya Grampus players
Ekstraklasa players
Bundesliga players
First Professional Football League (Bulgaria) players
J1 League players
UEFA Euro 2020 players
Polish expatriate footballers
Expatriate footballers in Germany
Polish expatriate sportspeople in Germany
Expatriate footballers in Bulgaria
Polish expatriate sportspeople in Bulgaria
Expatriate footballers in Japan
Polish expatriate sportspeople in Japan
Polish sportspeople in doping cases
Doping cases in association football